The Cemal Reşit Rey Concert Hall is a concert hall located in the Harbiye neighbourhood of Istanbul, Turkey. It is one of the country's major concert halls, being the first one designed for classical music. Named after the Turkish composer Cemal Reşit Rey (1904–1985), the hall is owned by the Metropolitan Municipality of Istanbul and operated by its subsidiary, the Kültür company. Opened in March 1989, it has a seating capacity of 860.

The concert hall hosts concerts, ballet and dance performances every year between October and May. It is also home to CRR Istanbul Symphony Orchestra, Turkish Musical Ensemble, CRR Big Band Jazz and CRR Instrumental Soloists.

The concert hall underwent an overhaul of its stage, stage and auditorium acoustics, foyer and auditorium design, heating and air conditioning facilities beginning in August 2007. The renovation works cost around 4 million (approx. US$3 million at that time), and were completed before the start of the new concert season.

See also
Cemil Topuzlu Open-Air Theatre
Ataturk Cultural Center
List of concert halls

References

External links
Official website

Music venues in Istanbul
Concert halls in Turkey
1989 establishments in Turkey
Şişli
Buildings and structures completed in 1989